The Lelang Commandery was a  commandery of the Han dynasty established after it had conquered Wiman Joseon in 108 BC and lasted until Goguryeo conquered it in 313. The Lelang Commandery extended the rule of the Four Commanderies of Han as far south as the Han River in present-day South Korea. South Korean scholars have described its administrative areas as being limited to the Pyongan and Hwanghae regions, whose southern bounds lie roughly 75 miles north of the Han River.

History

Han dynasty

In 108 BC, Emperor Wu of the Han dynasty conquered the area under King Ugeo, a grandson of King Wiman. The Emperor set up Lelang, Lintun, Xuantu and Zhenfan, known as the Four Commanderies of Han in the northern Korean peninsula and Liaodong peninsula. The Book of Han records Lelang belonged to Youzhou, located in northwestern Gojoseon consisted of 25 prefectures, 62,812 houses, and the population was 406,748. Its capital, then the prefecture of Joseon (朝鮮縣, 조선현), was located at modern P'yŏngyang. (Rakrang 樂浪/락랑, a district in central P'yŏngyang today, is named after Lelang.)

After Emperor Wu's death, Zhenfan and Lintun were abolished and Xuantu was moved to Liaodong. Some prefectures of the abolished commanderies were incorporated into Lelang. Lelang after the consolidation is sometimes called "Greater Lelang commandery". Since Lelang became too large, the Defender of the Southern Section (南部都尉) was set up to rule the seven prefectures which formerly belonged to Zhenfan. Before that, the Defender of the Eastern Section (東部都尉) was set up to rule former Lintun's seven prefectures.

Immigrants mainly from Yan and Qi settled in the former Gojoseon lands and brought with them Chinese culture. Among them, the Wang clan, whose ancestor is said to have fled there from Qi in the 2nd century BC, became powerful.

While the Han dynasty was taken over by Wang Mang, Wang Tiao (王調) started a rebellion and tried to secede from China. In 30 AD, the rebellion was stopped by Wang Zun (王遵), whom Emperor Guangwu appointed as governor. Lelang came under the direct control of China once again. However, the shortage of human resources caused by the turmoil resulted in the abolishment of the seven eastern prefectures. The administration was left to the Dongye natives, whose chiefs were conferred as marquises.

At the end of the Eastern Han dynasty, Gongsun Du, appointed as the Governor of Liaodong in 184, extended his semi-independent domain to the Lelang and Xuantu commanderies. His son Gongsun Kang separated the southern half from the Lelang commandery and established the Daifang commandery in 204. As a result, the Lelang commandery reverted to its original size.

Cao Wei
In 236, under the order of Emperor Ming of Cao Wei, Sima Yi crushed the Gongsun family and annexed Liaodong, Lelang and Daifang to Wei. Sima Yi did not encourage frontier settlers to continue their livelihoods in the Chinese northeast and instead ordered households who wished to return to coastal and central China to do so, evacuating the region of Chinese settlers. The Jin Shu records the number of households in the Korean commanderies of Lelang and Daifeng as 8,600 households, less than a sixth of the figures given in the Hou Han Shu for Lelang (which included Daifeng).  Liaodong would be out of Chinese hands for centuries due to the lack of Chinese presence there as a result of the policies the Wei court adopted for the commanderies after the fall of the Gongsun family.

Jin dynasty
Lelang was then inherited by the Jin dynasty. Due to bitter civil wars, Jin was unable to control its holdings within the northern section of the Korean peninsula at the beginning of the 4th century and was no longer able to dispatch officials to the frontier commanderies, which were maintained by the dwindling local population of remaining Han Chinese residents. The Zizhi Tongjian states that Zhang Tong (張統) of Liaodong, Wang Zun (王遵) of Lelang and over one thousand households decided to break away from Jin and submit to the Xianbei warlord of Former Yan Murong Hui. Murong Hui relocated the remnants of the commandery to the west within Liaodong. Goguryeo annexed the former territory of Lelang in 313. Goguryeo ended Chinese rule over any part of the Korean peninsula by conquering Lelang in 313. After Lelang's fall, some commandery residents may have fled south to the indigenous Han polities there, bringing with them their culture that spread to the southern part of the Korean peninsula.  With the collapse of the commanderies after four centuries of Chinese rule, Goguryeo and the native polities in the south that became Baekje and Silla began to grow and develop rapidly, heavily influenced by the culture of the Four Commanderies of Han.

Goguryeo absorbed much of what was left of Lelang through its infrastructure, economy, local inhabitants, and advanced culture.  Unable to govern the region directly and form a new political center immediately, Goguryeo began to consolidate authority by replacing previous government administrators with its own appointed officials, mostly refugees and exiles from China, the most famous being Dong Shou (冬壽) who was entombed at Anak Tomb No. 3, overtly retaining the previous administrative system of Lelang.  In 334 Goguryeo established the fortress and city of Pyongyang-song within the center of the former commandery. Towards the end of the 4th century, in order to focus on the growing threat of Baekje and having checked the power of Former Yan in Liaodong, Goguryeo began to actively strengthen and govern the city.  In 427 Goguryeo moved its capital to Pyongyang from its former capital of Ji'an as the new political center of the kingdom in order to administer its territories more effectively.

Historical revisionism 

In the North Korean academic community and some parts of the South Korean academic community, the Han dynasty's rule in the northern part of the Korean Peninsula have been denied. Proponents of this revisionist theory claim that the Lelang Commandery actually existed outside of the Korean Peninsula, and place them somewhere on the Liaodong Peninsula instead.

The characterization of Japanese historical and archaeological findings in Korea as imperialist forgeries owes in part to those scholars' discovery of the Lelang Commandery—by which the Han dynasty administered territory near Pyongyang—and insistence that this Chinese commandery had a major impact on the development of Korean culture. Until the North Korean challenge, it was universally accepted that Lelang was a commandery established by Emperor Wu of Han after he defeated Gojoseon in 108 BCE. To deal with the Han Dynasty tombs, North Korean scholars have reinterpreted them as the remains of Gojoseon or Goguryeo. For those artifacts that bear undeniable similarities to those found in Han China, they propose that they were introduced through trade and international contact, or were forgeries, and "should not by any means be construed as a basis to deny the Korean characteristics of the artifacts". The North Koreans also say that there were two Lelangs, and that the Han actually administered a Lelang on the Liao River on the Liaodong peninsula, while Pyongyang was an "independent Korean state" of Lelang, which existed between the 2nd century BCE until the 3rd century CE. The traditional view of Lelang, according to them, was expanded by Chinese chauvinists and Japanese imperialists.

These hypotheses are considered authoritative in the North Korean academic community, which is supported by some historians in South Korea, but this theory is not recognized at all in the academic circles of the United States, China and Japan. The majority of Korean scholars from the Goryeo and Joseon dynasties considered the location of Lelang county somewhere around today's Pyongyang area based on the Korean history record Samguk sagi which referred to the Chinese records on the Han commandries. However, Bak Jiwon (born 1737), a Silhak scholar who visited Qing dynasty in 1780, claimed that the location of commandries were in Liaodong area in his The Jehol Diary. Ri Ji Rin (Lee Ji Rin)，A North Korean historian who obtained his Ph.D in history from China's top university, Peking University, in his Research on Ancient Korea also suggests that based on the initial records of Chinese texts and archaeological findings in Liaodong area, the Han Commanderies were located in Liaodong Peninsula. South Korea Historian Yoon, Nae-Hyun also suggests that the Han commanderies were not in Korean peninsula, claiming that there is no archaeological evidence.

Maps

See also 
Daifang commandery
Canghai Commandery
Nakrang Kingdom
Protectorate General to Pacify the East

Notes

References 

100s BC establishments
Cao Wei
Commanderies of the Jin dynasty (266–420)
Former Yan
Four Commanderies of Han